Aeroporto Friuli Venezia Giulia S.p.A. is the operator of Trieste – Friuli Venezia Giulia Airport in Friuli – Venezia Giulia region of Italy.

The company is a minority owner of Aeroporto Amedeo Duca d'Aosta di Gorizia Società Consortile per Azioni, the operator of Gorizia Airport.

References

External links
 Portale Amministrazione 

Companies based in Friuli-Venezia Giulia
Province of Gorizia
Government of Friuli-Venezia Giulia
Transport in Friuli-Venezia Giulia
Region-owned companies of Italy
Airport operators of Italy